Eduardo "Lalo" Guerrero (December 24, 1916 – March 17, 2005) was an American guitarist, singer and farm labor activist best known for his strong influence on later Latin musical artists.

Early life
Guerrero was born in Tucson, Arizona, one of 21 siblings (although only nine survived). His father worked for the Southern Pacific Railroad. Guerrero left his hometown to pursue his dream in music. He says that he gives his mother all the credit for his musical talent, and Guerrero said she taught him to "embrace the spirit of being Chicano". Lalo’s mother, Concepcion Guerrero, taught him some basic musical skills and encouraged him to hone them during adolescence. She was no professional musician but had taught herself to play guitar. His relationship with his mother greatly influenced his music; one of the major themes of his work was the visibility of the Chicana struggle for dignity. His first group, Los Carlistas (the quartet included Greg "Goyo" Escalante, Chole Salaz and Joe Salaz), represented Arizona at the 1939 New York World's Fair, and performed on the Major Bowes Amateur Hour on radio.

He moved to Los Angeles in the 1940s, and had a few uncredited roles in movies, including Boots and Saddles and His Kind of Woman. He recorded for Imperial Records and fronted the Trio Imperial. He also formed his own orchestra and toured throughout the Southwest. He performed at the La Bamba club in Hollywood, a place frequented by the biggest stars in the movie business. In the 1960s, he bought a night club in Los Angeles and renamed it "Lalo's". In the 1940s he became a friend of the Ronstadt family of Arizona, in particular Gilbert Ronstadt, father of popular vocalist Linda Ronstadt. Linda recalls childhood memories of Guerrero serenading her. At his funeral, Linda sang a traditional Mexican song in tribute.

Music
Guerrero is known as the father of Chicano music. He recorded and wrote many songs in all sorts of genres. He recorded over 700 songs since his first record in 1939 with Los Carlistas on Vocalion Records. As a songwriter Guerrero wrote songs for El Trio los Panchos, Lola Beltran and many other famous artists.

His first American hit was "Pancho López", a parody of the popular 1950s hit "The Ballad Of Davy Crockett". Guerrero used the Davy Crockett melody and wrote his own lyrics, telling the story of a legendary Mexican character. Due to criticism Guerrero received over this song, he never performed it publicly, not wanting to contribute to an inappropriate stereotype. Guerrero went on to record several more parody songs, including "Pancho Claus," "Elvis Perez," "Tacos For Two" (to the tune of "Cocktails For Two"), and "There's No Tortillas" (to the tune of "O Sole Mio"). Guerrero's earliest Pachuco compositions of the 1940s and 1950s  were the basis of the Luis Valdez stage musical, Zoot Suit.

Early career 
Prior to WWII, he primarily played songs of Mexican origin. Guerrero explained that this was not necessarily because they were his favorite songs to play. "They couldn't conceive of a Mexican, especially one who looks as Indian as I do, sitting up there and singing Bing Crosby songs. So naturally the Anglos would get the jobs.... I reverted to singing Mexican music".

Labor songs
He also wrote songs about Cesar Chavez, other farm workers and braceros. Chavez said at tribute to Guerrero in 1992 in Palm Desert, California: "Lalo has chronicled the events of the Hispanic in this country a lot better than anyone." He worked closely with Chavez for farm workers' rights and lent voice to the movement with the song, "No Chicanos On TV."

WWII: Zoot Suit and Pachuca/o Subculture 
During WWII, Mexican-American women known as Pachucas began to challenge societal norms in relation to gender, labor, communication and representation. These Pachuca/o citizens were living in a paradox, a reality with three options in regard to their Mexican Vs. American heritage. They could either; completely assimilate and adhere to white America’s definition of “American”, completely rebel and be labeled Mexican delinquents, or they could try to find a balance in which they did not abandon their cultural identities, but also upheld values that would characterize them as American. The last option listed was the choice of those Pachuca/os wearing Zoot Suits. They wished to be their own person, make it in society on their own terms, and embrace being bilingual and multicultural. This movement and ideology played a key role in determining our modern definition of what it means to be an American. “The struggle for dignity by zoot suiters was thus a politics of refusal: a refusal to accept humiliation, a refusal to quietly endure dehumanization, and a refusal to conform.” These women, fighting for dignity, recognition, and equality would form a collective movement marching forward to the anthem of Lalo Guerrero’s music.

Guerrero’s music simultaneously evolved into the Zoot Suit/ Pachuca/o music of the 1940s and 1950s. His songs infused with Pachuco slang, a combination of informal Spanish and English, acted as a megaphone contextualizing the efforts of Chicanas. “His compositions about the pachuco era produced a string of hits and generated interest in the Pachuco dialect.” His Musical parodies such as, “Pancho Lopez” and “Mexican Mamas Don’t Let Your Babies Grow Up to be Busboys” invoke a comedic tone while also juxtaposing the American vs. Mexican-American experience. His emphasis on the gap between Anglo-American and Mexican-American goes hand in hand with the assertion of Chicanas that they are stuck in a paradox. Chicanas, during this time, sought to bridge the gap between the Anglo-American experience and the experiences of Mexican-Americans when it came to socioeconomic opportunity and equality.

Children's music
He also wrote children's songs presented via his "Las Ardillitas," or "Three Little Squirrels", with his voice sped up. Ross Bagdasarian, Sr., creator of Alvin and the Chipmunks, threatened lawsuit over alleged similarities between the Chipmunks and Las Ardillitas, until Guerrero provided evidence that he had conceived Las Ardillitas first.

In 1995 he recorded a children's album Papa's Dream with Los Lobos.

Collaborations
In 2005, Guerrero was one of several Chicano musicians who collaborated with Ry Cooder on Cooder's Chávez Ravine album, for which he provided vocals on three songs ("Corrido de Boxeo", "Los Chucos Suaves", and "Barrio Viejo") which helped bring him, at the twilight of his life, to the attention of a wider Anglo audience. Guerrero recorded his last full CD on Break Records, a Los Angeles-based record label, this at age 83. This would become his last music CD. The recording is a collection of Guerrero's best "Zoot Suit" compositions of Latin swing "Pachuco" music. The music CD was produced by music producer Benjamin Esparza, one of Guerrero's trusted friends during his last years. The Musical CD contained new recordings of his 1940s "Pachuco" swing music which was used in the Broadway play and Universal Pictures movie "Zoot Suit". The play was written and directed by Luis Valdez. The album, Vamos A Bailar-Otra Vez, was produced by Esparza and Justo Almario of Break Records.

Contributions to Mexican-American women’s rights 
Lalo Guerrero was able to amplify the voices of the Pachuca/o and Chicana/o Movements by playing songs which represented their culture; one of Mexican and American heritage. “In a career that spanned la Crisis of the 1930s, the Zoot Suit Riots of the 1940s, the Chicano Movement of the 1960s, Guerrero embodied the essential humanity of the barrios (Spanish speaking low income areas). He transformed what he saw and heard as a young man on la Calle Meyer (Meyer St.) into songs that touched millions of people.” Guerrero’s music directly aided the ability of Mexican-Americans, especially women, to publicly demonstrate the duality of their heritage and helped to bring their culture into mainstream America.

Legacy 
His career is somewhat symbolic of the various Mexican-American women’s rights movements. In the beginning of his career he was relegated to performing only Mexican songs in Spanish for audiences of Mexican descent. He, like the Chicanas and Pachucas, created something new, “…in a sense, Lalo was a greater artist than his predecessors because only he created his own music- music that made people laugh or cry, music that captured the jazzy spirit of a culture and a generation.” Lalo was able to successfully claim a public space for Chicano and Pachuco music and slang, as were the Chicanas and Pachucas. For most of his career, he was playing his music in other people’s clubs, just as the Chicanas were living their lives within other people’s guidelines. “Lalo remained in southern California after the war was over, singing in other people's nightclubs until 1956, when the success of "Pancho López," his parody of "Davy Crockett," enabled him to open Lalo's Place in East Los Angeles.” The opening of Lalo’s Place symbolizes the success Mexican Americans experienced in creating a space for themselves within American society, and progress in their quest to attain the opportunities of and be recognized as Americans but also respected as Mexican-American.

Tributes
Guerrero was officially declared a national folk treasure by the Smithsonian Institution in 1980 and was presented with the National Medal of Arts in 1996 by then United States President Bill Clinton. In 1991 Guerrero received a National Heritage Fellowship from the National Endowment for the Arts, which is the United States government's highest honor in the folk and traditional arts. In late 2005 Guerrero was posthumously inducted into the Arizona Music and Entertainment Hall of Fame. Along with that he was also inducted into the Tejano Hall of Fame and the Mariachi Hall of Fame.

Guerrero's contributions have resulted in Las Glorias, a restaurant in central Phoenix, Arizona displaying a poster of him with his signature on it on the wall for everyone to see in loving memory of him. He also has a blown-up, candid photograph of him as a young man on the wall of a major underpass in Tucson. In Cathedral City, California, the main street in front of the Civic Center is named for him: Avenida Lalo Guerrero. All official city documentation contains Lalo's name in the address.

In 1994 a Golden Palm Star on the Palm Springs Walk of Stars dedicated to him.

Personal life and death
Guerrero was married for over 34 years to his wife Lidia Guerrero. They both lived in Cathedral City, California for over 28 years. Guerrero died on March 17, 2005, in Rancho Mirage, California. He was 88 years old.

References

Further reading

External links
 
 
 Lalo Guerrero discography from his son Mark's website
 National Public Radio report on Guerrero's death
 Break Records website
 Guide to the Lalo Guerrero collection at the California Ethnic and Multicultural Archives

1916 births
2005 deaths
American musicians of Mexican descent
American blues guitarists
American jazz guitarists
American norteño musicians
American rhythm and blues guitarists
American salsa musicians
American comedy musicians
Mambo musicians
Parody musicians
American parodists
Rock and roll musicians
Swing guitarists
Hispanic and Latino American musicians
United States National Medal of Arts recipients
Musicians from Los Angeles
Musicians from Tucson, Arizona
People from Cathedral City, California
20th-century American musicians
National Heritage Fellowship winners
Imperial Records artists